Renzo José Zambrano (born 26 August 1994) is a Venezuelan footballer who plays as a midfielder for Phoenix Rising FC in the USL Championship.

Club career
Born in Aragua de Maturín, Zambrano graduated with Monagas SC's youth setup. On 14 August 2011, aged just 16, he made his professional debut, coming on as a half-time substitute in a 2–0 away win against Aragua FC for the Primera División championship.

Zambrano appeared regularly during his first two seasons at the club, but was demoted to the reserves in his third. On 24 June 2014 he moved to Deportivo Lara, also in the top division.

On 8 March 2015 Zambrano scored his first professional goal, netting the second in a 2–1 win at Caracas FC. On 13 July he signed a two-year deal with Real Valladolid, initially assigned to the B-team.

Zambrano made his first team debut for the Pucelanos on 21 August 2016, starting in a 1–0 Segunda División home win against Real Oviedo.

On 22 August 2017, Zambrano signed for United Soccer League side Portland Timbers 2.

Zambrano signed with the Portland Timbers first team for the 2019 season.

On 5 February 2022, Zambrano signed for Armenian Premier League club Pyunik.

Zambrano signed with Phoenix Rising FC on December 1, 2022.

International career
After representing Venezuela at under-17 and under-20 levels, Zambrano was called up to the main side on 2 November 2016 for two 2018 FIFA World Cup qualifying matches against Bolivia and Ecuador. He made his full international debut eight days later, starting in a 5–0 routing of the former.

Career statistics

Club

Honours

Club 
Pyunik
 Armenian Premier League: 2021–22

Portland Timbers
MLS is Back Tournament: 2020

References

External links

1994 births
Living people
Venezuelan footballers
Association football midfielders
Venezuelan Primera División players
Monagas S.C. players
Asociación Civil Deportivo Lara players
Segunda División players
Segunda División B players
Real Valladolid Promesas players
Real Valladolid players
Portland Timbers 2 players
Venezuela under-20 international footballers
Venezuela international footballers
Venezuelan expatriate footballers
Venezuelan expatriate sportspeople in Spain
Expatriate footballers in Spain
Portland Timbers players
Phoenix Rising FC players
USL Championship players
Major League Soccer players
People from Monagas